National Tertiary Route 317, or just Route 317 (or ) is a National Road Route of Costa Rica, located in the San José province.

Description
In San José province the route covers Puriscal canton (Mercedes Sur, Candelarita districts).

References

Highways in Costa Rica